John Deighan (born 19 December 1982) is a Gaelic footballer who plays for the Derry county team, with whom he has won a National League title. He plays his club football for Limavady Wolfhounds GAC. He plays as goalkeeper for Derry.

Playing career

Inter-county
Deighan was called up to the Derry Senior panel in 2008. He helped Derry reach the 2008 Dr McKenna Cup final, where they were defeated by Down. He was part of the Derry panel that won that year's National League where Derry beat Kerry in the final. The league success saw Derry become favourites to win the Ulster Championship and one of the top few for the All-Ireland. However, despite a good opening victory over Donegal, Derry exited the Ulster Championship against Fermanagh at the semi-final stage and were defeated by Monaghan in the first round of the Qualifiers. The Donegal match saw Deighan make his Championship debut. He missed the Fermanagh game through injury, but returned for the Monaghan match.

Championship matches' details

A.  Result column lists Derry's score first
Statistics accurate as of 17 January 2009

Limavady Wolfounds G.A.C.

Honours

Inter-county
National Football League:
Winner (1): 2008
Dr McKenna Cup:
Runner up: 2008

Note: The above lists may be incomplete. Please add any other honours you know of.

References

External links
Player profiles on Official Derry GAA website
Limavady Wolfhounds GAC website

1982 births
Living people
Derry inter-county Gaelic footballers
Gaelic football goalkeepers
Limavady Gaelic footballers
People from Limavady